The 2018 Taiwan Open was a women's tennis tournament played on indoor hard courts. It was the third edition of the event and part of the WTA International tournaments of the 2018 WTA Tour.

Points and prize money

Point distribution

Prize money

1 Qualifiers' prize money is also the Round of 32 prize money
* per team

Singles main-draw entrants

Seeds

1 Rankings as of January 15, 2018.

Other entrants
The following players received wildcards into the singles main draw:
  Eugenie Bouchard 
  Chang Kai-chen
  Lee Ya-hsuan

The following players received entry using a protected ranking:
  Sabine Lisicki
  Wang Yafan

The following players received entry from the qualifying draw:
  Anna Blinkova
  Lizette Cabrera
  Han Xinyun
  Dalila Jakupović
  Junri Namigata
  Zhang Yuxuan

The following player received entry as a lucky loser:
  Lu Jingjing

Withdrawals 
Before the tournament
 Belinda Bencic → replaced by  Kurumi Nara
 Margarita Gasparyan → replaced by  Wang Yafan
 Daria Gavrilova → replaced by  Zhu Lin
 Elina Svitolina → replaced by  Lu Jingjing
 Lesia Tsurenko → replaced by  Ana Bogdan
 Alison Van Uytvanck → replaced by  Risa Ozaki

Retirements 
 Ons Jabeur
 Zhu Lin

Doubles main-draw entrants

Seeds

1 Rankings as of January 15, 2018.

Other entrants 
The following pairs received wildcards into the doubles main draw:
  Chan Chin-wei /  Liang En-shuo
  Hsu Ching-wen /  Lee Ya-hsuan

Champions

Singles

  Tímea Babos def.  Kateryna Kozlova, 7–5, 6–1

Doubles

  Duan Yingying /  Wang Yafan def.  Nao Hibino /  Oksana Kalashnikova, 7–6(7–4), 7–6(7–5)

References
General
Official website
Specific

Taiwan Open
WTA Taiwan Open
2018 in Taiwanese tennis
Taiwan Open
Taiwan Open